Mohammad Bassam Imadi (born 1950) is the former Syrian ambassador to Sweden, who defected from the Bashar al-Assad government in 2011 and became a member of the opposition Syrian National Council.

Career
Imadi resigned from his post as Syrian ambassador to Sweden in 2009. He began working with the opposition at the start of the uprising in March 2011.

Defection
Imadi fled to Turkey with his family in December 2011.

References

1950 births
Living people
People of the Syrian civil war
Syrian defectors
Ambassadors of Syria to Sweden